This is a list of tallest structures in Romania. The list is incomplete.
Please complete and correct, if necessary.

* including antenna

See also
List of tallest buildings in Romania
List of tallest buildings in Bucharest

External links
 Skyscrapers in Bucharest
 skyscraperpage.com
 https://web.archive.org/web/20160304061816/http://dione.geophys.nat.tu-bs.de:5214/dragos/public/Zbor/romania/AIP/ENR/ENR5/LR_ENR_5_4_en.pdf
 http://www.aisro.ro/aip/2013-05-02/DOCS/AIP/ENR/ENR5/LR_ENR_5_4_en.pdf

 
Romania
Romania
Lists of buildings and structures in Romania